Kurt Czekalla (30 September 1930 – 19 March 2002) was a German sport shooter who competed in the 1968 Summer Olympics winning a bronze medal in the trap event.

References

1930 births
2002 deaths
German male sport shooters
Trap and double trap shooters
Olympic shooters of East Germany
Shooters at the 1968 Summer Olympics
Olympic bronze medalists for East Germany
Olympic medalists in shooting
Medalists at the 1968 Summer Olympics
People from Schönebeck
Sportspeople from Saxony-Anhalt
20th-century German people
21st-century German people